Triclonella bicoloripennis is a moth in the family Cosmopterigidae. It is found in North America, where it has been recorded from Louisiana, Mississippi, South Carolina and Texas.

The wingspan is about 11 mm. Adults have been recorded on wing from May to September.

References

Natural History Museum Lepidoptera generic names catalog

Cosmopteriginae
Moths of North America
Moths described in 1962